HMS Loch Dunvegan was a  frigate of the British Royal Navy, named after Loch Dunvegan in Scotland. Launched in 1944, the ship saw service in the Second World War, and in the Mediterranean Fleet in the early 1950s, before being broken up in 1960.

Service history

Second World War
Commissioned in June 1944, the ship was allocated for service in the 10th Escort Group for Atlantic convoy defence duty. In August she was detached to the 20th Escort Group for Russian convoy duty, joining Convoy JW 59 to Murmansk. The next day the convoy arrived at Kola Inlet and the ship was detached to join Convoy RA 59A for the return journey. She rejoined 10th Escort Group at Derry on 5 September, to serve in convoy and anti-submarine operations. In March the Group was transferred to the English Channel to continue operations against U-boats.

Post-war
After the German surrender in May 1945 the ship was transferred to the Rosyth Escort Force and also employed in Air-Sea Rescue duty in the Atlantic. She also supported re-occupation operations in Norway. In August 1945 Loch Dunvegan was transferred to 1st Anti-Submarine Training Flotilla based at Londonderry, where she served until August 1947 when she was decommissioned and placed in reserve at Devonport.

In 1948 her pennant number was changed to K425 from F425.

Mediterranean Fleet, 1950s
After a refit Loch Dunvegan was recommissioned on 1 May 1950 for service in the 2nd Frigate Flotilla of the Mediterranean Fleet, arriving at Malta on 26 June. The usual programme of exercises and visits followed, and including a period as Guard ship at Aqaba. While under repair at Gibraltar on 27 April 1951 she gave assistance after the destruction of the ammunition ship RFA Bedenham in an explosion. In May 1951 she returned to Malta to rejoin the 2nd Frigate Flotilla, but when entering Mellieħa, she grounded, sustaining extensive damage, including the loss of propeller blades. Further repairs took until September, and on her arrival at Sliema the ship was involved in a series of collisions, including one with the destroyer , the Leader of the 3rd Destroyer Flotilla. In January–February 1952 Loch Dunvegan was deployed as Guardship at Port Said during Egyptian threats to nationalise the Suez Canal, and provided shore parties in support of the military authorities after widespread anti-British riots. Flotilla duties and exercises then occupied her until November 1952 when she returned to the UK, was decommissioned and put into reserve at Devonport and then Penarth.

Loch Dunvegan remained in reserve at Penarth until 1960 when she was sold for scrapping at Thos. W. Ward of Briton Ferry, where the ship arrived under tow on 24 August 1960.

References

Publications
 

 

1944 ships
Ships built in Bristol
Dunvegan (K425)
World War II frigates of the United Kingdom
Cold War frigates of the United Kingdom